The Kamloops Chiefs were a junior ice hockey team based in Kamloops, British Columbia that played in the Western Canada Hockey League from 1973–77.  They were founded in 1971 as the Vancouver Nats, and relocated to Seattle, Washington to become the Seattle Breakers in 1977.

Season-by-season record
Note: GP = Games played, W = Wins, L = Losses, T = Ties Pts = Points, GF = Goals for, GA = Goals against

NHL alumni

Barry Beck
Dan Clark
Rob Flockhart
Jamie Gallimore
Brad Gassoff
Reg Kerr
Dwayne Lowdermilk
Terry McDonald
Barry Melrose
Glenn Merkosky
Andy Moog
Larry Playfair
Errol Rausse
Rocky Saganiuk
Mark Taylor
Alec Tidey
Ryan Walter
Tim Watters

See also
List of ice hockey teams in British Columbia
Kamloops Blazers

References
2005–06 WHL Guide
hockeydb.com

Defunct ice hockey teams in British Columbia
Defunct Western Hockey League teams
Defunct British Columbia Hockey League teams
Sport in Kamloops
1973 establishments in British Columbia
1977 disestablishments in British Columbia